Anachis aliceae is a species of sea snail in the family Columbellidae, the dove snails.

References

aliceae
Gastropods described in 1900